The Dana language, referred to in older literature as Buldit, is a recently recognized Koman language of Ethiopia. It is geographically close to the Opuo language but is not mutually intelligible with it.

References 

Languages of Ethiopia
Languages of South Sudan
Koman languages